Sir Henry North, 1st Baronet (c 1609 – 29 August 1671) was an English politician who sat in the House of Commons variously between 1656 and 1671.  

North was the son of Sir Roger North of Mildenhall and his wife, Elizabeth Gilbert, daughter of Sir John Gilbert of Great Finborow, Suffolk.

In 1656, North was elected Member of Parliament for Suffolk in the Second Protectorate Parliament.

In 1660, North was elected MP for Suffolk in the Convention Parliament.  He was created baronet of Mildenhall on 14 June 1660. He was re-elected MP for Suffolk in 1661 for the Cavalier Parliament and sat until his death in 1671.  

North married Sarah Rayney, daughter of John Rayney of West Malling, Kent. He was succeeded by his son Henry. His daughter Peregrina married William Hanmer and was the mother of Sir Thomas Hanmer, 4th Baronet, Speaker of the House of Commons.

References

1600s births
1671 deaths
People from Mildenhall, Suffolk
Year of birth uncertain
Baronets in the Baronetage of England
English MPs 1656–1658
English MPs 1660
English MPs 1661–1679